Sumou Towers (formerly Lamar Towers) are a pair of skyscrapers currently under construction in the city of Jeddah, Saudi Arabia. Located on Jeddah Corniche, Sumou Towers consists of two towers, the southern tower 71 floors and the northern 62 floors. The project also includes a number of commercial offices and at the same time it includes a commercial shopping center (mall) that includes the most luxurious shops and international restaurants, in addition to a sports center, spa and multiple areas for luxury.

The proposal for the project was submitted by Cayan in 2008 and was approved in the same year. Construction began in 2008 and, when completed in 2024, Tower 1 will be the tallest building in Jeddah, till date, surpassing the recently completed National Commercial Bank. The development is expected to cost about $600 million. The tower was designed by Saudi Diyar Consultants. The Construction Management Service is by MIDRAR. The Lamar company is the main developer of the project and Drake & Scull Construction are the main contractors for this landmark development.

The holding company has declared bankruptcy and construction on the building has stopped. There are many civil suits against the company for property sold in these buildings.

Lamar is Arabic for liquid gold, which describes the reflection of the golden glass in the waters of the Red Sea.

Asmo Company (100% owned by Sumou Holding Company) has acquired Sumo Towers (formerly Lamar), one of the leading projects in the Kingdom of Saudi Arabia, with its prime location on the northern Corniche of Jeddah, overlooking the Red Sea. The project has been partially constructed and Asmo aims to complete the construction and development of the project.

Description
The Lamar Towers will include the following: 
 Underground parking for over 500 cars.
 Retail center - The Lamar Mall. 
 Offices - Over 10 floors of office space. 
 The Lamar Spa - this membership only spa will provide separate facilities for men and women.
 Residential - 1, 2, 3, or 4 bedroom apartments and Penthouse/Royal Floors.

Owners
Drake & Scull International is carrying out the MEP works, with KASKTAS Arabia responsible for the piling, shoring, grouting, soil improvement and dewatering works. The architectural and engineering concept and schematic design for Lamar Towers was undertaken by RMJM Dubai.

The main contract was awarded originally to Arabian Construction Company in October 2008, but it was reportedly subsequently reawarded to Arabtec in May 2009 by developer Cayan Investment & Development, according to Arab News. The structure part of the project was then awarded on 12 October 2010 to the Saudi Lebanese Tarouk Contracting company Ltd who constructed a substantial part of the Project and two towers (up to levels 26, both towers) before being terminated by the Owner on 31 December 2012. The remaining part of the structure and the Project were transferred then in July 2013 to the UAE based general contractor Drake & Scull Construction, part of the Drake & Scull International PJSC group.

Asmo Company (100% owned by Sumou Holding Company) has acquired Sumo Towers (formerly Lamar), one of the leading projects in the Kingdom of Saudi Arabia, with its prime location on the northern Corniche of Jeddah, overlooking the Red Sea. The project has been partially constructed and Asmo aims to complete the construction and development of the project.

Gallery

See also
 List of tallest buildings in Saudi Arabia

References

External links
Official Website
Emporis
Artist Rendering
Article From Construction Week Online
Ventures Onsite | Projects Database for MENA Region

Skyscrapers in Jeddah
Buildings and structures under construction in Saudi Arabia
Twin towers